Uri Barbash (Hebrew: אורי ברבש; born 24 December 1946) is an Israeli film director.

He directed the film "Beyond the Walls" (1984 film) written by his brother Benny Barbash and Eran Preis. the film was nominated for the Academy Award for Best Foreign Language Film. The film is about an overcrowded prison where Jewish and Arab inmates set aside their prejudices and unite in a daring escape plan.

His film Echad Mishelanu (One of Us) (1989) is an Israeli drama about a military policeman sent to investigate his former comrades in an elite paratroop unit charged with the murder of  an Arab who killed a member of the unit. The screenplay was written by the director's brother, Benny Barbash, a peace activist and playwright.

Filmography
Beyond the Walls (1984)
Unsettled Land The Dreamers (1987)
One of Us (1989)
Real Time (1991)
Beyond the Walls 2 (1992)
Spring 1941 (2008)
Black Honey: The Poetry and Life of Avraham Sutzkever (2018)
The Girl from Oslo (2021)

References

External links

1946 births
Living people
Film people from Tel Aviv
Israeli film directors